The Punisher, also known as The Punisher: Purgatory, is a four-issue comic book limited series written by Christopher Golden and Thomas E. Sniegoski, illustrated by Bernie Wrightson, and published by Marvel Comics (through the Marvel Knights imprint) from 1998 to 1999. The series was a departure from typical Punisher stories in that it dealt with supernatural themes.

Plot 

After Frank Castle's suicide, the alley where he shot himself became a shrine for all the downtrodden victims of crime. However, a figure with glowing eyes and an arcane sigil on his forehead has been carrying out similar deeds as the Punisher once did. This phantom slowly begins to remember who he is, eventually discovering not only the possession that drives him, but the guardian angel that failed to save his family.

Prints

Issues 

 "Purgatory, Part 1: The Harvest"
 "Purgatory, Part 2: The Mark of Cain"
 "Purgatory, Part 3: A Gathering of Angels"
 "Purgatory, Part 4: The Hour of Judgment"

Continuity 

The angelic rendition of the Punisher reappears in the four-issue miniseries Wolverine/The Punisher: Revelation.

In The Punisher series following this one, the character has gone back to being a mortal vigilante combating mundane criminals; the return to the status quo is explained via the Punisher commenting that he had grown weary of doing Heaven's bidding (referring to the offer made to him at the end of the aforementioned Revelation) and had quit its employ after telling the angels "where to stick it".

The Egyptian deity Khonshu expressed interest in the Punisher, but was deterred from anointing him by the Punisher's connection to Olivier, remarking that the vigilante "belongs to another" and that he "flies his lord's banner" (the Punisher's skull insignia). Later, while a member of the Thunderbolts, the Punisher is healed by an angel's feather after being fatally wounded. When Deadpool asks why the feather was drawn to him, the Punisher snaps, "I don't want to talk about it".

The series retcons the events in Marvel Super Action #1, which had the Costa brothers die at the hands of an assassin named Audrey, not the Punisher. Additionally, Olivier insinuates that his own skull-like face inspired the Punisher's emblem, when it had earlier been implied in The 'Nam that the inspiration for the symbol came from a Viet Cong sniper called Monkey.

Reception 

The comic has been ridiculed for its revamping of the Punisher mythos, with Matt Duarte of The Weekly Crisis musing that it "alienated many readers and made the character toxic until Garth Ennis engineered his revival some years later". Nick Nadel of Comics Alliance wrote, "Even horror legend Bernie Wrightson's artwork couldn't make Angel Punisher and his weird spiky guns not look completely silly and dated". Cracked.com's Maxwell Yezpitelok opined that the storyline "completely undermined the intent of the character who had the simplest goal of any superhero ever" and that it felt like "the sort of bullshit premise that could have only come from the mind of a coke-fueled TV executive pitching a toy-friendly Punisher animated series where they don't actually show him killing people". Ethan Kaye of Topless Robot succinctly stated in regards to the volume, "Thank God we have Garth Ennis to give us back the Punisher who liked guns and bombs again". 4thletter's Gavin Jasper said, "Purgatory still doesn't get as much hate as it deserves. Angel Punisher isn't a completely unusable idea. As a fan of Franken-Castle, I'd be a hypocrite for suggesting such a thing. If Ennis felt like it, I'm sure he could come up with a way to make it work. Remender and Ostrander (the last guy to write Punisher before this status quo) could make it work. Here, though, there's nothing that redeems such a bonehead concept."

Chuck Dixon, writer of various Punisher comics throughout the early 1990s, criticized the alterations made to the character's backstory, asserting, "I don't think origins like Batman's or Punisher's should be visited over and over again with everyone adding their two cents until the sum of all added details don't fit any more" and "Punisher's origin has been similarly screwed up, changing in the identities of his family's killers, making it a purposeful rather than random act".

References

External links 

 
 

Comics set in New York City
Defunct American comics
Punisher
Punisher
Punisher
Science fantasy comics